SEX MACHINEGUN is the first studio album by the Japanese heavy metal band Sex Machineguns.

Track listing 
 Sex Machinegun
 Japan
 Scorpion Death Rock
 Devil Wing
 桜島
 High Speed Samurai
 ファミレスボンバー
 犬の生活
 Hanabi-La 大回転
 Burn ~愛の炎を燃やせ~

External links 
 Sex Machinegun at Oricon 
 SEX MACHINEGUN at Metal Archives

Sex Machineguns albums
1998 debut albums